Riccardo Boglione (born 1970 in Genoa) is an Italian art curator, lecturer, writer, and art critic.

He holds a PhD from the University of Pennsylvania. He specializes in avant-garde art and conceptual writing.

Since 2006 he lives and works in Montevideo, Uruguay.

Selected works
 Ritmo D. Feeling the Blanks (2009) 
 Tapas sin libro (2011)
 Extremo Explicit. 99 poemas de Riccardo Boglione (2014)
 It Is Foul Weather In Us All (2018) 
 Teoría de la novela. Novela (2021)

References

External links
 Author Riccardo Boglione - Legislative Library of Uruguay

1970 births
People from Genoa
University of Pennsylvania alumni
Italian writers
Italian art curators
Italian art critics
Living people